David Hyde Pierce is an American actor, director and comedian of the stage and screen.

He is most known for his performance as the psychiatrist Dr. Niles Crane on the critically acclaimed NBC hit sitcom Frasier (1993-2004) opposite Kelsey Grammer. He is also known for his films roles including Terry Gilliam's The Fisher King (1991), Nora Ephron's Sleepless in Seattle (1993), Mike Nichols' Wolf (1994), and Oliver Stone's Nixon (1995). He is also known for his performances in the cult comedies Wet Hot American Summer (2001), and Down with Love (2003), and the dark comedy film The Perfect Host (2010). His voice roles include Disney Pixar's A Bug's Life (1998), Osmosis Jones (2001), and Treasure Planet (2002). Pierce is also known for his work on stage including for his Broadway roles include Sir Robin in Monty Python's Spamalot, Vanya in Vanya and Sonia and Masha and Spike and Horace Vandergelder in Hello, Dolly!. He won the 2007 Tony Award for Best Performance by a Leading Actor in a Musical for his performance in Curtains. In 2010 he received the Isabelle Stevenson Award for his philanthropic work.

Major associations

Tony Awards

Primetime Emmy Award

Golden Globe Award

Screen Actors Guild Award

Grammy Award

Theatre awards

Drama Desk Awards

Drama League Award

Outer Critics Circle Award

Audio awards

Audie Awards

References 

Lists of awards received by American actor